Apoda limacodes, also known as the festoon, is a species of moth of the family Limacodidae.

Distribution and habitat
The moth is found in most of Europe. Within Great Britain, the species is scarce.

The festoon mainly inhabits thick woodlands. The larvae are known to feed on oak and beech.

Life cycle and behaviour
The larva is small and grub-like. After storms, caterpillars are often observed in large numbers between August and October. Cocoons are not attached, but overwinter and pupate in the spring.

Adults have a wingspan of 24–28 mm, with male specimens generally slightly smaller and darker than females. It is primarily nocturnal, but it will occasionally fly in the daytime. The moth usually flies between June and July.

References

External links

Fauna Europaea
Lepiforum.de
Vlindernet.nl 

Limacodidae
Moths of Europe
Taxa named by Johann Siegfried Hufnagel
Moths described in 1766